J. Robert Hayes (born February 28, 1932) is an American politician. He served as a Republican member for the 39th district of the California State Assembly.

Hayes was born in Glendale, California. Hayes went to school in Los Angeles, and then attended Los Angeles City College. Hayes served in the United States Navy and the United States Marine Corps Reserve. In 1978, he was elected for the 39th district of the California State Assembly. Hayes succeeded Jim Keysor. In 1980, he was succeeded by Richard Katz.

References 

1932 births
Living people
People from Glendale, California
Republican Party members of the California State Assembly
20th-century American politicians
Los Angeles City College alumni